Anwar Raslan (born 3 February 1963) is a Syrian former colonel who led a unit of Syria's General Intelligence Directorate. In January 2022, he was convicted of crimes against humanity in a German Higher Regional Court under universal jurisdiction. The specific charges against him were 4,000 counts of torture, 58 counts of murder, rape and sexual coercion. His case was the first international war crimes case against a member of the Syrian government during the presidency of Bashar al-Assad.

Early life and career 
Anwar Raslan was born in 1963 in Taldou in the Homs governorate, Syria. After completing a degree in law, he served as a security service officer in Damascus. In 2006, Raslan was responsible for the detention of Syrian lawyer and human rights defender Anwar al-Bunni. In 2008, he became colonel, and head of the intelligence department of Branch 251 (internal branch), also known as branch al-Khatib, part of the General Intelligence Directorate. Raslan was tasked with the internal safety of Al-Khatib prison, located in Damascus. In July 2012, Raslan moved to branch 285 of the state security forces. Branch 285 mostly dealt with high value prisoners, such as political detainees.

According to the German journalist Christoph Reuter, who interviewed Raslan in Jordan, Raslan defected out of shame for his employer: he had wanted to investigate an attack in Damascus of January 2012, which the government refused since the attack had been staged by the Syrian secret service. For many Syrian exiles, it was out of opportunism, not out of conviction, that Anwar Raslan fled the Assad regime, of which he was an essential cog.

Arrest and conviction
Raslan defecting from the Assad government and was smuggled with his family to Jordan in December 2012. He travelled to Germany in 2014 and was granted asylum there in the same year. He was arrested in February 2019 and charged in March 2020. The trial began in April 2020 in the city of Koblenz and was held until January 13, 2022. The European Center for Constitutional and Human Rights (ECCHR), the Syria Justice and Accountability Centre and the podcast 'Branch 251' have documented the trial. The prosecution is part of a larger trend in universal jurisdiction to investigate and hold accountable individuals who committed crimes during the Syrian civil war. On December 2, 2021, the German federal prosecutor's office called for the life sentence against Anwar Raslan, in the first trial in the world for abuses committed by the Bashar al-Assad government.

On January 13, 2022, Raslan was sentenced by the state court in Koblenz to imprisonment for life "for a crime against humanity in the form of killing, torture, severe deprivation of liberty, rape and sexual coercion in unity of action with 27 counts of Mord ('severe' murder in the German penal code), 25 counts of dangerous bodily harm, two counts of especially serious rape, sexual coercion, 14 counts of deprivation of liberty for more than one week, two counts of hostage-taking and three counts of sexual abuse of prisoners."

See also 
 Human rights violations during the Syrian civil war

Notes

References 

1963 births
21st-century criminals
Male criminals
Syrian colonels
Refugees in Germany
Prisoners and detainees of Germany
Living people
Prisoners sentenced to life imprisonment by Germany
Syrian emigrants to Germany
Torture in Syria
People convicted of torture
People of the Syrian civil war
People convicted of crimes against humanity